Ajoy Kar (Bengali:অজয় কর; 27 March 1914 – 25 January 1985) was an Indian film director and cinematographer . He directed 26 films between 1949 and 1983. His 1961 film Saptapadi was entered into the 3rd Moscow International Film Festival. Ajoy Kar provided a whole new expression to Bengali cinema. His 1971 film Malyadan won the National Film Award for Best Feature Film in Bengali.

Early life 
Ajoy Kar was born on 27 March 1914, in Calcutta, British India. He left college in 1931 to become a professional photographer, and took up cinematography a few years later.

Career 
After initially working as an assistant to Jatin Das, Kar became a cinematographer at Indrapuri Studios, Calcutta, in 1938. Over the next four decades, he shot more than 80 feature films. He also shot a number of documentary films.

Kar's first film as director was Ananya (1949), made by the Sabyasachi collective launched by Kanan Devi. The first film for which he received individual directorial credit was Bamuner Meye (1949). During the 1950s and early 1960s, he emerged as a key figure in mainstream Bengali cinema, with a string of commercially successful films such as Shyamali (1956), Harano Sur (1957), Saptapadi (1961) and Saat Pake Bandha (1963). Of these, Harano Sur and Saptapadi involved the popular romantic pair of Uttam Kumar and Suchitra Sen. These films also received critical acclaim.

Filmmaking style 

From the late 1960s onwards, he made a number of films which were adaptations of well-known literary works, especially those by Rabindranath Tagore and Sarat Chandra Chatterjee. Some of these are Parineeta (1969), Malyadan, Datta (1976) and Naukadubi (1979). In all, he directed 26 films, the last being Bishabriksha (1983). He was influenced by western literature and western Movie. His spectacular camera work created him a Different Personality than other Bengali Filmmakers.

Legacy
Malyadan and Saat Pake Bandha
has been restored and digitised by the National Film Archives of India. Goutam Ghose says that Mrinal Sen was compelled to write scripts for directors like Ajay Kar’s Kanch Kata Heera.His works impact and influence on South Indian filmmakers like C. V. Sridhar and P. S. Ramakrishna Rao. and Bollywood filmmaker like Anil Ganguly and Partially influence on Bengali Filmmaker like Tarun Majumdar

Awards and honours 
 18th National Film Awards – Malyadan won the National Film Award for Best Feature Film in Bengali.
 5th National Film Awards – Harano Sur received a Certificate of Merit for 3rd best film in Bengali
 9th National Film Awards – Saptapadi received a Certificate of Merit for 2nd best film in Bengali
 11th National Film Awards – Saat Pake Bandha received a Certificate of Merit for 2nd best film in Bengali
BFJA Awards 1972—Best Indian Films for Malyadan.
Silver Prize for Best Actress: Suchitra Sen at Moscow International Film Festival for Saat Pake Bandha.

Selected filmography

 Ananya (1949) 
 Bamuner Meye (1949)
 Jighansa (1951)
  Darpachurna  (1952) 
 Grihapravesh (1954)
 Sajghar (1955) 
 Paresh (1955) 
 Shyamali (1956)
 Harano Sur (1957)
 Bardidi (1957)
 Khelaghar (1959)
 Suno Baranari (1960) 
 Saptapadi (1961)
 Atal Jaler Ahwan (1962)
 Barnali  (1963) 
  Saat Pake Bandha  (1963)
 Prabhater Rang (1964) 
Kanch Kata Hirey (1965) 
 Parineeta (1969)
 Malyadan (1971)
 Kaya Hiner Kahini (1973) 
 Datta (1976)
 Naukadubi (1979)
 Madhuban (1983) 
 Bishabriksha (1983)

References

External links

1914 births
1985 deaths
20th-century Indian film directors
Film directors from Kolkata
Bengali film directors